Alberik de Suremain (born 19 August 1950) is a Guatemalan rower. He competed in the men's coxless pair event at the 1980 Summer Olympics.

References

External links
 
 

1950 births
Living people
Guatemalan male rowers
Olympic rowers of Guatemala
Rowers at the 1980 Summer Olympics
Place of birth missing (living people)